Mike Gordon (November 15, 1957 – June 25, 2005) was an American politician who served as a member of the California State Assembly. After his swearing in in December 2004, he was diagnosed with a brain tumor in March and died in June 2005. Prior to his time in the Assembly, he served as the mayor of El Segundo, CA from 1996 until 2004. He also served as the executive director of the California Democratic Party from 1983 until 1985. He was a principal in the El Segundo-based political fund-raising firm Gordon & Schwenkmeyer, which has many prominent Democrats among its clients.

In 2004, Gordon left the office of mayor of El Segundo to run for State Assembly. He won by a close margin over Redondo Beach mayor Greg Hill.

References 

 Vassar, A (2015). A Decade Later: Assemblyman Mike Gordon. One Voter Project.
 Vogel, N (2005). Mike Gordon, 47; Assemblyman Was Ex-Mayor of El Segundo, Businessman. Los Angeles Times.

External links
Join California Mike Gordon

1957 births
2005 deaths
Members of the California State Assembly
People from El Segundo, California
20th-century American politicians
21st-century American politicians
Mayors of places in California